Verticordia vicinella is a flowering plant in the myrtle family, Myrtaceae and is endemic to the south-west of Western Australia. It is a shrub with narrow leaves and groups of small, scented, pink or pale yellow flowers, growing near Esperance and in the Cape Arid National Park.

Description

Flowering time is usually from January to May, but has been recorded in most months.

This species is similar to Verticordia minutiflora but the flowers are usually pink, where those of V.minutiflora are mostly grey to mauve. Verticordia vicinella also has staminodes between its stamens.

Taxonomy and naming
Verticordia vicinella was first formally described by Alex George in 1991 from a specimen collected near Esperance and the description was published in Nuytsia. The specific epithet (vicinella) is derived from the Latin word vicinus meaning "near" with the diminutive suffix -ella referring to the small flowers and similarity to V. minutiflora.

George placed this species in subgenus Verticordia, section Micrantha along with V. minutiflora and V. fastigiata.

Distribution and habitat
This verticordia grows in sand, sometimes in areas that are wet in winter. It occurs in the south of Western Australia between Esperance and Mount Ragged in the Cape Arid National Park in the Esperance Plains and Mallee biogeographic regions.

Conservation
Verticordia vicinella is classified as "Not Threatened" by the Western Australian Government Department of Parks and Wildlife.

Use in horticulture
Verticordia vicinella is readily propagated from cuttings, easy to establish in gardens and is hardy in well-drained soil.

References

vicinella
Endemic flora of Western Australia
Myrtales of Australia
Rosids of Western Australia
Plants described in 1991